Vinicius Moreira de Lima (born 11 June 1996), known as Lima, is a Brazilian footballer who plays as an attacking midfielder for Fluminense.

Club career
Born in Porto Alegre, Rio Grande do Sul, Lima joined Grêmio's youth setup in 2013, after starting it out at Tanabi. On 17 July 2015 he was loaned to Spanish Segunda División side RCD Mallorca, in a season-long deal.

Initially assigned to the main squad, Lima was not registered by the Balearics' main squad, and was only assigned to the reserves in Tercera División in January 2016. He made his senior debut on 31 January of that year by starting in a 0–0 home draw against CE Constància, and scored his first goal on 13 February in a 2–0 home win against UD Alaró.

Lima subsequently returned to Grêmio (which refused a € 1 million offer from Mallorca) in July 2016, and was included in the first team by manager Roger Machado. He only made his first team debut on 2 March of the following year, starting in a 1–1 Primeira Liga home draw against Ceará.

Lima made his Série A debut on 28 May 2017, coming on as a second-half substitute for fellow youth graduate Careca in a 3–4 loss at Sport.

Honours
Grêmio
Recopa Sudamericana: 2018

Ceará
Copa do Nordeste: 2020

References

External links

1996 births
Living people
People from Araçatuba
Brazilian footballers
Association football midfielders
Campeonato Brasileiro Série A players
Campeonato Brasileiro Série B players
Grêmio Foot-Ball Porto Alegrense players
Ceará Sporting Club players
Fluminense FC players
Tercera División players
RCD Mallorca B players
Al-Wasl F.C. players
UAE Pro League players
Brazilian expatriate footballers
Expatriate footballers in Spain
Brazilian expatriate sportspeople in Spain
Expatriate footballers in the United Arab Emirates
Footballers from São Paulo (state)